Linda Konttorp (born 31 March 1974) is a former Norwegian sailor. She was born in Åsgårdstrand, and represented the Tønsberg Yacht Club. She competed at the 1996 Summer Olympics in Atlanta, where she placed seventh in the Europe class.

References

External links

Norwegian female sailors (sport)
1974 births
Living people
People from Horten
Sailors at the 1996 Summer Olympics – Europe
Olympic sailors of Norway
Sportspeople from Vestfold og Telemark